Augusta Louise Schultz Hobart (July 28, 1871 – September 30, 1925) was an American female tennis player who was active in the late 19th and early 20th centuries.

Biography
Schultz was born in New Jersey and grew up in New York City, the daughter of German emigrants Carl Herman Schultz of Posen and his wife Louise Eissfeldt of Hamburg.

Career
Schultz reached the All-Comers final of the 1893 women's singles U.S. National Championships at the Philadelphia Cricket Club, Chestnut Hill in which she lost to compatriot Aline Terry in two sets. This match decided the title as the reigning champion from Ireland Mabel Cahill did not defend her title in the Challenge Round. Later that same day she also lost the final of the women's doubles with her partner M Stone against Terry and Harriet Butler.

Schultz married tennis player Clarence Hobart in 1895. The couple won the U.S. National Championships mixed doubles title in 1905.

Death
Schultz Hobart died of intestinal cancer at Mission Hospital in Asheville, North Carolina, age 54.

Grand Slam finals

Singles (1 runner-up)

Doubles (1 runner-up)

Mixed doubles (1 title)

References

1871 births
1925 deaths
American female tennis players
Grand Slam (tennis) champions in mixed doubles
Sportspeople from New York City
American people of German descent
People from Union County, New Jersey
Deaths from colorectal cancer
United States National champions (tennis)
Tennis people from New York (state)